Biscayan, sometimes Bizkaian is a dialect of the Basque language spoken mainly in Biscay, one of the provinces of the Basque Country of Spain.

It is named as Western in the Basque dialects' classification drawn up by linguist Koldo Zuazo, since it is not only spoken in Biscay but also extends slightly into the northern fringes of Alava and deeper in the western part of Gipuzkoa. The dialect's territory bears great similarity to that of the Caristii tribe, as described by Roman authors.

While it is treated as stylish to write in Biscayan and the dialect is still spoken generally in about half of Biscay and some other municipalities, it suffers from the pressure of Spanish.

Biscayan was used by Sabino Arana and his early Basque nationalist followers as one of the signs of Basqueness.

Sociolinguistic features
In the words of Georges Lacombe, because of the special features of this dialect, Euskera could well be divided into two groups of dialects: Biscayan and the rest. He argued that this dialect was so different from the rest, that the isoglosses separating it from the adjacent dialects (Gipuzkoan or central) are so close to each other that form a clear line; that is, the phonetic-phonological, morphosyntactic and lexical features of Biscayan coincide geographically to the point of creating a distinctively clear and defined dialectical border.

Because of these differences both with the rest of the Basque dialects and also with Standard Basque or Batua, and respecting their corresponding uses, the Euskaltzaindia has produced a Model for Written Biscayan, a set of rules mainly focused on morphosyntax. The official use of the dialects of Euskera is regulated through Regulation 137 of the Euskaltzaindia, according to which the use of Batua should be limited to the fields of communication, administration and teaching.

Since 1997 and according to the new dialectical classification realized by Koldo Zuazo, author of Euskalkiak. Herriaren lekukoak (Elkar, 2004), the name given to Biscayan is the Western Dialect, due to its use not being limited to the province of Biscay, but with users in some Gipuzkoan regions such as Debagoiena (mainly) and Debabarrena, and also some Alavan municipalities such as Aramaio (Aramayona) and Legutio (Villarreal).

According to study by Yrizar, this dialect was spoken in the seventies by around 200,000 people, with the number of estimated speakers approaching 300,000 by the eighties. In 1991 16% of the population of this province could speak Basque, and data gathered in 2001 data 22% of the total 1,122,710 Biscayans (i.e. 247,000) could speak and write in Basque. However, this data is only illustrative, as there is no record of how many of the Basque speakers spoke Biscayan specifically and it does not take into account Biscayan speakers in Gipuzkoan territory (Bergara, Leintz Gatzaga, Mondragon, Oñati, etc.)

Subdialects and variations

Biscayan is not a homogeneous dialect, it has two subdialects and eight main variations.

The  introduced several neologisms and purist forms.
They also used a spelling with characters such as  ĺ and ŕ, straddling away of the Spanish-influenced tradition. 
Only some of their innovations had been taken up by modern Biscayan and Standard Basque.

Western subdialect
Uribe-Kosta
Mungialdea
Txorierri 
Nerbion Valley 
Zeberio
Arratia 
Orozko

Variations
Dialectal variation around the border between the Western and Eastern subdialects. The territory includes: Busturialdea, Otxandio and Villarreal.
Dialectal variation happens the border between the Western dialect (Biscayan) and the Central dialect (Gipuzkoan). The territory includes: Elgoibar, Deba, Mendaro and Mutriku.

Eastern subdialect
Lea-Artibai 
Durangaldea 
Aramaio
Debagoiena
Debabarrena
Ermua
Eibar
Soraluze

Geography and history
The borders of Biscayan match those of the pre-Roman tribe of the Caristii. Biscay was formerly included, along with Alava and the Valley of Amezcoa, within the ecclesiastical circumscription of Calahorra, which explains the wide influence of the Western Dialect in these regions.

Phonology

Some features of Biscayan as perceived by other dialect speakers may be summed up as follows:
 The verb root  used for the dative auxiliary verb (--), e.g. / vs. .
 Auxiliary verb forms -- most of the time, as opposed to general Basque .
 Convergence of sibilants: z , x  and s  > x ; tz , tx  and ts  > tz .
 Clusters  generally turned into , e.g.  > . 
 The conspicuous absence of past tense 3rd person mark  at the beginning of auxiliary verbs, e.g.  vs. .
 Assimilation in vowel clusters at the end of the noun phrase, notably -ea > -ie/i and -oa > -ue/u.
 VñV ending words, as opposed to the Beterri Gipuzkoan VyV or standard Basque V∅V:  vs , standard Basque .

Vocabulary
Biscayan dialect has a very rich lexicon, with vocabulary varying from region to region, and from town to town. One of the current main experts in local vocabulary is Iñaki Gaminde, who in the last years has extensively researched and published on this subject.

Media

Radio 
 Bizkaia Irratia: FM  
 Arrakala Irratia: FM 106.0 (Lekeitio).
 Arrate Irratia: FM 87.7 (Eibar).
 Irratia Arrasate irratia: FM 107.7 (Debagoiena).
 Bilbo Hiria Irratia: FM 96.0 (Bilbao).
 Itsuki Irratia: FM 107.3 (Bermeo).
 Matrallako Irratixa: FM 102.8 (Eibar).
 Radixu Irratia: FM 105.5 (Ondarroa).
 Tas-Tas: FM 95.0 (Bilbao).

Newspaper 
 Goiena: Debagoiena

Magazine 
 Aikor: Txorierri.
 Anboto: Durangaldea.
 Bagabiz Aldizkaria: Gernika.
 Barren: Elgoibar.
 Begitu: Arratia.
 Berton: Bilbao.
 Bizkaie: Txurdinaga, Bilbao.
 Drogetenitturri: Ermua.
 Eta kitto!: Eibar.
 Kalaputxi: Mutriku.
 Pil-pilean: Soraluze.
 Prest!: Deusto, Bilbao.

Television 
 GOITB: Debagoiena.
 Urdaibai Telebista: Gernika.

See also
Basque dialects

References

External links 
 Bizkaiera hiztegitxoa

Basque dialects
Biscay